During the 1989–90 English football season, Luton Town F.C. competed in the Football League First Division. They finished 17th in the First Division, only escaping relegation on goal difference. There was a managerial change halfway through the season when Ray Harford was sacked after two-and-a-half years in charge to be succeeded by Jimmy Ryan.

Squad

Results

First Division

 25 November: Southampton 6-3 Luton Town

See also
 List of Luton Town F.C. seasons
 1989–90 Football League
 1989–90 FA Cup

References

1989-90
Luton Town